The 1973 Wimbledon Championships was a tennis tournament that took place on the outdoor grass courts at the All England Lawn Tennis and Croquet Club in Wimbledon, London, United Kingdom. The tournament was scheduled to be held from Monday 25 June until Saturday 7 July 1973 but rain on the final Friday meant that the women's singles final was postponed until Saturday and the mixed doubles final was rescheduled to Sunday 8 July. It was the 87th staging of the Wimbledon Championships, and the third Grand Slam tennis event of 1973. Jan Kodeš and Billie Jean King won the singles titles. King became the first player in the open era to claim the triple crown, the second time in her career she won all three titles open to women players. Her three victories necessitated playing six matches on the final weekend of the tournament: The singles final, the doubles semi-final and final and the mixed doubles quarter-final, semi-final and final, which was played on the extended Sunday schedule.

ATP boycott
In May 1973 Nikola Pilić, Yugoslavia's number one tennis player, was suspended by his national lawn tennis association, the Yugoslav Tennis Association, which claimed he had refused to play in a Davis Cup tie for his country against New Zealand earlier that month. The initial suspension of nine months, supported by the International Lawn Tennis Federation (ILTF), later was reduced by the ILTF to one month, which meant that Pilić would not be permitted to play at Wimbledon. The recently formed men's players union, the Association of Tennis Professionals (ATP), stated that none should compete if Pilić were not allowed to compete. As a result, 81 of the top players, including reigning champion Stan Smith, boycotted Wimbledon in 1973 to protest the suspension of Nikola Pilić. Twelve of the 16 men's seeds had withdrawn. This resulted in a large number of qualifiers and lucky losers.

Three ATP players, Ilie Năstase, Roger Taylor and Ray Keldie, defied the boycott and were fined by the ATP's disciplinary committee. Năstase unsuccessfully appealed the fine as he insisted that as a serving captain, he was under orders from the Romanian army and government to compete. Some contemporary press speculation and later biographies have suggested Năstase contrived to lose his fourth round match as he supported the ATP boycott, but to have lost any earlier to a considerably less able player would have been too obvious. Năstase never has commented on this speculation. Despite the boycott, the attendance of 300,172 was the second highest in the championships' history to that date.

Prize money
The total prize money for 1973 championships was £52,400. The winner of the men's title earned £5,000 while the women's singles champion earned £3,000.

* per team

Champions

Seniors

Men's singles

 Jan Kodeš defeated  Alex Metreveli, 6–1, 9–8(7–5), 6–3

Women's singles

 Billie Jean King defeated  Chris Evert, 6–0, 7–5
It was King's 10th career Grand Slam title (her 6th in the Open Era), and her 5th Wimbledon title.

Men's doubles

 Jimmy Connors /  Ilie Năstase defeated  John Cooper /   Neale Fraser, 3–6, 6–3, 6–4, 8–9(3–7), 6–1

Women's doubles

 Rosemary Casals /  Billie Jean King defeated  Françoise Dürr /  Betty Stöve, 6–1, 4–6, 7–5

Mixed doubles

 Owen Davidson /  Billie Jean King defeated  Raúl Ramírez /  Janet Newberry, 6–3, 6–2
King became the only player to win the 'triple crown' (Singles, Doubles & Mixed Doubles) twice in the post-war era, repeating her success of 1967.

Juniors

Boys' singles

 Billy Martin defeated   Colin Dowdeswell, 6–2, 6–4

Girls' singles

 Ann Kiyomura defeated  Martina Navrátilová, 6–4, 7–5

Singles seeds

Men's singles
  Ilie Năstase (fourth round, lost to Sandy Mayer)
  Jan Kodeš (champion)
  Roger Taylor (semifinals, lost to Jan Kodeš)
  Alex Metreveli (final, lost to Jan Kodeš)
  Jimmy Connors (quarterfinals, lost to Alex Metreveli)
  Björn Borg (quarterfinals, lost to Roger Taylor)
  Owen Davidson (fourth round, lost to Vijay Amritraj)
  Jürgen Fassbender (quarterfinals, lost to Sandy Mayer)

The original seeding list before the boycott was:

Women's singles
  Margaret Court (semifinals, lost to Chris Evert)
  Billie Jean King (champion)
  Evonne Goolagong (semifinals, lost to Billie Jean King)
  Chris Evert (final, lost to Billie Jean King)
  Rosie Casals (quarterfinals, lost to Chris Evert)
  Virginia Wade (quarterfinals, lost to Evonne Goolagong)
  Kerry Melville (quarterfinals, lost to Billie Jean King)
  Olga Morozova (quarterfinals, lost to Margaret Court)

References

External links
 Official Wimbledon Championships website

 
Wimbledon Championships
Wimbledon Championships
Wimbledon Championships
Wimbledon Championships